The province of the West Kalimantan in Indonesia is divided into regencies which in turn are divided administratively into districts, known as Kecamatan.

The districts of West Kalimantan, with the regency each falls into, are as follows:

Air Besar (Big Water), Landak
Air Upas (Upas Water), Ketapang
Ambalau, Sintang
Anjongan, Pontianak Regency
Badau, Kapuas Hulu
Balai, Sanggau
Banyuke Hulu, Landak
Batang Lupar, Kapuas Hulu
Batu Ampar (Ampar Stone), Kubu Raya
Batu Datu (Datu Stone), Kapuas Hulu
Beduai, Sanggau
Belimbing, Melawi
Belimbing Hulu, Melawi
Belitang, Sekadau
Belitang Hilir, Sekadau
Belitang Hulu, Sekadau
Bengkayang, Bengkayang
Benua Kayong, Ketapang
Bika, Kapuas Hulu
Binjai Hulu, Sintang
Bonti, Sanggau
Boyan Tanjung, Kapuas Hulu
Bunut Hilir, Kapuas Hulu
Bunut Hulu, Kapuas Hulu
Capkala, Bengkayang
Dedai, Sintang
Delta Pawan, Ketapang
Ella Hilir, Melawi
Embaloh Hilir, Kapuas Hulu
Embaloh Hulu, Kapuas Hulu
Embau, Kapuas Hulu
Empanang, Kapuas Hulu
Entikong, Sanggau
Galing, Sambas
Hulu Gurung, Kapuas Hulu
Hulu Sungai, Ketapang
Jagoi Babang, Bengkayang
Jangkang, Sanggau
Jawai, Sambas
Jawai Selatan (South Jawai), Sambas
Jelai Hulu, Ketapang
Jelimpo, Landak
Kalis, Kapuas Hulu
Kapuas, Sanggau
Kayan Hilir, Sintang
Kayan Hulu, Sintang
Kelam Permai, Sintang
Kembayan, Sanggau
Kendawangan, Ketapang
Ketungau Hilir, Sintang
Ketungau Hulu, Sintang
Ketungau Tengah (Central Ketungau), Sintang
Kuala Behe, Landak
Kuala Mandor B, Kubu Raya
Kubu, Kubu Raya
Ledo, Bengkayang
Lembah Bawang (Onion Valley), Bengkayang
Lumar, Bengkayang
Mandor, Landak
Manis Mata, Ketapang
Marau, Ketapang
Matan Hilir Selatan (South Matan Hilir), Ketapang
Matan Hilir Utara (North Matan Hilir), Ketapang
Meliau, Sanggau
Mempawah Hulu, Landak
Mempawah Hilir, Pontianak Regency
Mempawah Timur (East Mempawah), Pontianak Regency
Menjalin, Landak
Mentebah, Kapuas Hulu
Menukung, Melawi
Menyuke, Landak
Meranti, Landak
Monterado, Bengkayang
Muara Pawan (Pawan Estuary), Ketapang
Mukok, Sanggau
Nanga Mahap, Sekadau
Nanga Pinoh, Melawi
Nanga Taman, Sekadau
Nanga Tayap, Ketapang
Ngabang, Landak
Noyan, Sanggau
Paloh, Sambas
Parindu, Sanggau
Pemahan, Ketapang
Pemangkat, Sambas
Pinoh Selatan (South Pinoh), Melawi
Pinoh Utara (North Pinoh), Melawi
Pontianak Barat (West Pontianak), Pontianak City
Pontianak Kota (the City of Pontianak), Pontianak City
Pontianak Selatan (South Pontianak), Pontianak City
Pontianak Tengah (Central Pontianak), Pontianak City
Pontianak Tenggara (Southeast Pontianak), Pontianak City
Pontianak Timur (East Pontianak), Pontianak City
Pontianak Utara (North Pontianak), Pontianak City
Pulau Maya Karimata (Maya Karimata Island), North Kayong
Puring Kencana, Kapuas Hulu
Putussibau Selatan (South Putussibau), Kapuas Hulu
Putussibau Utara, (North Putussibau), Kapuas Hulu
Rasau Jaya, Kubu Raya
Sadaniang, Pontianak Regency
Sajad, Sambas
Sajingan Besar (Big Sajingan), Sambas
Salamantan, Bengkayang
Salatiga, Sambas
Sambas, Sambas
Sandai, Ketapang
Sanggau Ledo, Bengkayang
Sayan, Melawi
Sebangki, Landak
Sebawi, Sambas
Seberuang, Kapuas Hulu
Segedong, Pontianak Regency
Sejangkung, Sambas
Sekadau Hilir, Sekadau
Sekadau Hulu, Sekadau
Sekayam, Sanggau
Selakau, Sambas
Selakau Timur (East Selakau), Sambas
Selimbau, Kapuas Hulu
Seluas, Bengkayang
Semitau, Kapuas Hulu
Semparuk, Sambas
Sengah Temila, Landak
Sepauk, Sintang
Seponti, North Kayong
Serawai, Sintang
Siantan, Pontianak Regency
Siding, Bengkayang
Silat Hilir, Kapuas Hulu
Silat Hulu, Kapuas Hulu
Simpang Dua, Ketapang
Simpang Hilir, North Kayong
Simpang Hulu, Ketapang
Singkawang Barat (West Singkawang), Singkawang City
Singkawang Selatan (South Singkawang), Singkawang City
Singkawang Tengah (Central Singkawang), Singkawang City
Singkawang Timur (East Singkawang), Singkawang City
Singkawang Utara (North Singkawang), Singkawang City
Singkup, Ketapang
Sintang, Sintang
Sokan, Melawi
Sompak, Landak
Subah, Sambas
Suhaid, Kapuas Hulu
Sukadana, North Kayong
Sungai Ambawang (Ambawang River), Kubu Raya
Sungai Betung (Betung River), Bengkayang
Sungai Kakap (Kakap River), Kubu Raya
Sungai Kunyit (Turmeric River), Pontianak Regency
Sungai Laur (Laur River), Ketapang
Sungai Melayu Rayak (Rayak Malay River), Ketapang
Sungai Pinyuh (Pinyuh River), Pontianak Regency
Sungai Raya (Raya River), Bengkayang
Sungai Raya (Raya River), Kubu Raya
Sungai Raya Kepulauan(Raya River Islands), Bengkayang
Sungai Tebelian (Tebelian River), Sintang
Suti Semarang, Bengkayang
Tanah Pinoh, Melawi
Tanah Pinoh Barat (West Tanah Pinoh), Melawi
Tangaran, Sambas
Tayan Hilir, Sanggau
Tayan Hulu, Sanggau
Tebas, Sambas
Tekarang, Sambas
Teluk Batang (Batang Bay), North Kayong
Teluk Keramat (Sacred Bay), Sambas
Teluk Pakedai (Pakedai Bay), Kubu Raya
Tempunak, Sintang
Terentang, Kubu Raya
Teriak, Bengkayang
Toba, Sanggau
Toho, Pontianak Regency
Tujuh Belas (Seventeen), Bengkayang
Tumbang Titi, Ketapang

Districts of West Kalimantan
West Kalimantan